Andrew Bettwy may refer to:

Andrew Jackson Bettwy (1894–1950), American politician 
Andrew Leo Bettwy (1920–2004), State Land Commissioner of Arizona, US